"We Didn't Start the Fire" is a song written and published by American musician Billy Joel. The song was released as a single on September 18, 1989, and later released as part of Joel's album Storm Front on October 17, 1989. A list song, its fast-paced lyrics include brief references to 118 significant political, cultural, scientific, and sporting events between 1949 (the year of Joel's birth) and 1989, in a mainly chronological order.

The song was nominated for the Grammy Award for Record of the Year and became Joel's third single to reach number one on the United States Billboard Hot 100 in late 1989. Storm Front became Joel's third album to reach number one in the United States. "We Didn't Start the Fire", particularly in the 21st century, has become the basis of many pop culture parodies, and continues to be repurposed in various television shows, advertisements, and comedic productions.

History 
Billy Joel conceived the idea for the song when he had just turned 40. He was in a recording studio and met a 21-year-old friend of Sean Lennon who said "It's a terrible time to be 21!". Joel replied: "Yeah, I remember when I was 21 – I thought it was an awful time and we had Vietnam, and y'know, drug problems, and civil rights problems and everything seemed to be awful". The friend replied: "Yeah, yeah, yeah, but it's different for you. You were a kid in the fifties and everybody knows that nothing happened in the fifties". Joel retorted: "Wait a minute, didn't you hear of the Korean War or the Suez Canal Crisis?". Joel later said those headlines formed the basic framework for the song.

Joel later criticized the song on strictly musical grounds. In 1993, when discussing it with documentary filmmaker David Horn, Joel compared its melodic content unfavorably to his song "The Longest Time": "Take a song like 'We Didn't Start the Fire.' It's really not much of a song ... If you take the melody by itself, terrible. Like a dentist drill."

When asked if he deliberately intended to chronicle the Cold War with his song he responded: "It was just my luck that the Soviet Union decided to close down shop [soon after putting out the song]", and that this span "had a symmetry to it, it was 40 years" that he had lived through. He was asked if he could do a follow-up about the next couple of years after the events that transpired in the original song, he commented: "No, I wrote one song already and I don't think it was really that good to begin with, melodically".

Historical events referenced 

Though the lyrics are rapid-fire with several people and events mentioned in each stanza, there is widespread agreement on the meaning of the lyrics. Steven Ettinger wrote:

See section  Events mentioned for more details.

Critical reception 
David Giles from Music Week wrote, "Promising return which finds Joel in rockier mood with a very wordy song cramming in references to virtually every major figure and event in the twentieth century. After all that, the message of the lyrics is foggy and confused, but this should certainly see him back in the charts."

Music video 

A music video for the song was directed by Chris Blum. The video begins with a newly married couple entering their 1940s-style kitchen, and shows events in their domestic life over the next four decades, including the addition of children, their growth, and later, grandchildren, and the eventual death of the family's father. The passage of time is also depicted by periodic redecoration and upgrades of the kitchen, while an unchanging Billy Joel looks on in the background. Joel is also shown banging on a table in front of a burning backdrop depicting various images that include the execution of Nguyễn Văn Lém and Lee Harvey Oswald, among others.

Derivations 
Many parodies and takeoffs have been based on the song (often expanding to events that have occurred since 1989). These parodies include The Simpsons parody "They'll Never Stop the Simpsons" at the end of the 2002 "Gump Roast" episode, and the San Francisco a cappella group The Richter Scales' 2007 Webby Award-winning parody "Here Comes Another Bubble."

In 2006, Coca-Cola sampled the song to make an anthem for the 2006 FIFA World Cup in Latin America, changing the lyrics according to the country.

In 2007, JibJab created a parody of the song for their Year in Review video.

YouTuber Dane Boedigheimer, known as creator of the popular comedic Web series Annoying Orange, produced a parody as part of YouTube's Comedy Week in 2013 titled "We Didn't Start the Viral." A copyright claim on monetization resulted in the audio being completely replaced on the original upload, although fan reuploads of the original exist.

Pop band Milo Greene performed a version of the song in June 2013 for The A.V. Club A.V. Undercover series.

In 2019, talk show host Jimmy Fallon performed a version of the song for The Tonight Show, which highlights characters and moments in the Marvel Cinematic Universe since Iron Man, leading to Avengers: Endgame, with backup by cast members Robert Downey Jr, Chris Hemsworth, Chris Evans, Jeremy Renner, Don Cheadle, Mark Ruffalo, Paul Rudd, Danai Gurira, Karen Gillan and Brie Larson.

 Personnel 
Billy Joel – vocals, clavinet, percussion
Liberty DeVitto – drums, percussion
David Brown – lead guitar
Joey Hunting – rhythm guitar
Crystal Taliefero – backing vocals, percussion
Schuyler Deale – bass guitar
John Mahoney – keyboards
Sammy Merendino – electronic percussion
Kevin Jones – keyboard programming
Doug Kleeger – sounds effects and arrangements

 Charts 

 Weekly charts 

 Year-end charts 

 All-time charts 

 Certifications 

 In popular culture 
In 2019, the song was sung by several cast members of the Marvel Cinematic Universe and Jimmy Fallon, in the lead up to Avengers: Endgame, to the theme of the Infinity Saga, chronicled up until that time of events by the introduction of the major characters and movie titles.

In 2021, a weekly podcast began, hosted by Katie Puckrik and Tom Fordyce, entitled We Didn't Start the Fire. Each week they examine a subject mentioned in the Billy Joel song, in lyric order, and discuss its importance and cultural significance with an expert guest.

The song features prominently, along with a number of other Billy Joel songs, in the streaming series The Boys from Amazon Prime in which the character Hughie Campbell, played by Jack Quaid, has a preoccupation with the American singer.

In the finale episode of Veep, "Veep", the song plays when Selina Meyer and Jonah Ryan are announced as their party's presidential and vice-presidential candidates respectively during the 2020 election, a call-back to Meyer's desire to have Billy Joel perform at her inauguration.

Irish rock band "The Memories" wrote and recorded "The Game" ("We're Gonna Start a Fire"), a rewritten  version of "We Didn't Start The Fire" in which the lyrics reference The Republic of Ireland's time in the 1990 World Cup.

 Events mentioned 
The following events, with Joel's lyric for each appearing in bold, are listed in the order that they appear in the song, which is almost entirely chronological. The lyrics for each individual event are brief and the events are punctuated by the chorus and other lyrical elements. The following list includes longer, more descriptive names for clarity. Events from a variety of contexts – such as popular entertainment, foreign affairs, and sports – are intermingled, giving an impression of the culture of the time as a whole. There are 118 events listed in the song.

 1940s 

 1948 Harry Truman wins the 1948 United States presidential election following a partial term after the death of Franklin D. Roosevelt.Doris Day debuts in film in Romance on the High Seas, featuring the popular song "It's Magic".

 1949 Red China: is established by The Communist Party of China which wins the Chinese Civil War.Johnnie Ray: The rock and roll progenitor signs his first recording contract with Okeh Records.
 South Pacific, the award-winning musical, opens on Broadway.Walter Winchell, an influential radio and newspaper journalist, begins to denounce Communism as the main threat facing America.Joe DiMaggio signs a record-breaking $100,000 contract with the New York Yankees.

 1950s 

 1950 Joe McCarthy, a U.S. Senator, gains national attention and begins his anti-Communism crusade with his Lincoln Day speech.Richard Nixon is first elected to the United States Senate.Studebaker, a popular automobile company, begins its financial downfall.Television becomes widespread throughout Europe and North America.North Korea invades South Korea, beginning the Korean War.Marilyn Monroe appears in five films, including The Asphalt Jungle and All About Eve.

 1951 
 The Rosenbergs, married couple Ethel and Julius, are convicted of espionage.H-Bomb: The United States is developing the hydrogen bomb as a nuclear weapon.
 Sugar Ray Robinson, a champion boxer, defeats Jake LaMotta in the "St. Valentine's Day Massacre".Panmunjom, a border village in Korea, is the location of truce talks between the parties of the Korean War.
 Marlon Brando is nominated for the Academy Award for Best Actor for his role in A Streetcar Named Desire.
 The King and I, the musical by Rodgers and Hammerstein, opens on Broadway.
 The Catcher in the Rye, a controversial novel by J. D. Salinger, is published.

 1952 
 Dwight D. Eisenhower is the landslide winner of the 1952 United States presidential election.Vaccine for polio is successfully developed by Jonas Salk.England's got a new queen: Princess Elizabeth succeeds to the throne as Queen Elizabeth II and is crowned the following year.
 Rocky Marciano defeats Jersey Joe Walcott, becoming the world heavyweight boxing champion.Liberace first broadcasts The Liberace Show.
 Santayana goodbye: George Santayana, philosopher, essayist, poet, and novelist, dies.

 1953 Joseph Stalin, leader of the Soviet Union, dies.
 Georgy Malenkov succeeds Stalin for six months. 
 Gamal Abdel Nasser acts as the true power behind the new Egyptian nation as Muhammad Naguib's minister of the interior.
 Sergei Prokofiev, a popular Russian composer, dies.
 Winthrop Rockefeller had a highly publicized divorce in 1953, but Nelson Rockefeller and John D. Rockefeller III also made headlines that year. Billy Joel himself has stated that Nelson Rockefeller was meant, in particular for his fame as governor of New York state.  However, Nelson was governor from 1959 to 1973, whereas all other items in this verse happened in 1953.
 Roy Campanella, a baseball catcher for the Brooklyn Dodgers, receives the National League's Most Valuable Player award for the second time.Communist Bloc: The East German uprising of 1953 is crushed by the Volkspolizei and the Group of Soviet Forces in Germany.

 1954 Roy Cohn resigns as Joseph McCarthy's chief counsel and enters private practice.Juan Perón is at the height of his power as President of Argentina before a coup the following year.
 Arturo Toscanini is at the height of his fame as a conductor, performing regularly with the NBC Symphony Orchestra on U.S. national radio.Dacron is an early artificial fiber made from the same plastic as polyester.Dien Bien Phu falls: The fall of this French/Vietnamese camp to Việt Minh forces leads to the creation of North Vietnam and South Vietnam as separate states.
 "Rock Around the Clock" is a hit single released by Bill Haley & His Comets.

 1955 
 Albert Einstein dies at the age of 76.James Dean achieves success with East of Eden and Rebel Without a Cause, but dies in a car accident at the age of 24.Brooklyn's got a winning team: The Brooklyn Dodgers win their first and only World Series before their move to Los Angeles.
 Davy Crockett, a Disney television miniseries about the legendary frontiersman Davy Crockett, was a huge hit and inspired a short-lived "coonskin cap" craze.Peter Pan, recently featured in a Disney animated feature, is also the subject of a stage musical starring Mary Martin, broadcast on NBC live and in color.Elvis Presley signs with RCA Records on November 21, beginning his pop career, going on to earn a reputation as the "King of Rock and Roll".Disneyland opens as Walt Disney's first theme park.

 1956 
 Brigitte Bardot stars in And God Created Woman, the film that establishes her international reputation as a French "sex kitten".Budapest, is the site of the Hungarian Revolution.Alabama is the site of the Montgomery bus boycott, one of the pivotal events in the civil rights movement.
 Nikita Khrushchev makes his famous Secret Speech denouncing Stalin's "cult of personality".
 Princess Grace Kelly appears in her last film High Society, and marries Prince Rainier III of Monaco.
 Peyton Place, the best-selling socially scandalous novel by Grace Metalious, is published.Trouble in the Suez: The Suez Crisis deepens as Egypt nationalizes the Suez Canal.

 1957 Little Rock, Arkansas, is the site of a standoff between Governor Orval Faubus and President Eisenhower over the Little Rock Nine attending a previously whites-only high school.
 Boris Pasternak, the Russian author, publishes his novel Doctor Zhivago.Mickey Mantle is in the middle of his career as a famous New York Yankees outfielder and American League All-Star for the sixth year in a row.
 Jack Kerouac publishes his novel On the Road, a defining work of the Beat Generation.Sputnik becomes the first artificial satellite, launched by the Soviet Union, marking the start of the space race.Chou En-lai, Premier of the People's Republic of China, survives an assassination attempt.
 The Bridge on the River Kwai is released, and receives seven Academy Awards, including Best Picture.

 1958 Lebanon is engulfed in a political and religious crisis that eventually involves U.S. intervention.Charles de Gaulle is elected first president of the French Fifth Republic following the Algerian Crisis.
 California baseball begins as the Brooklyn Dodgers and New York Giants move to California.
 Starkweather homicide: Charles Starkweather killed eleven people, mostly in Lincoln, Nebraska.Children of Thalidomide: Many pregnant women taking the drug Thalidomide had children born with congenital birth defects.

 1959 Buddy Holly dies in a plane crash with Ritchie Valens and The Big Bopper. Joel prefaces the lyric with a Holly signature vocal hiccup: "Uh-huh, uh-huh."
 Ben-Hur starring Charlton Heston, wins eleven Academy Awards, including Best Picture.Space Monkey: A rhesus macaque and a squirrel monkey become the first two animals to be launched by NASA into space and survive.Mafia leaders are convicted in the Apalachin meeting trial, confirming it as a nationwide conspiracy.Hula hoops sales reach 100 million as the latest toy fad.
 Fidel Castro comes to power after a revolution in Cuba.Edsel is a no-go: Production of this much-advertised car marque ends after only three years due to poor sales.

 1960s 

 1960 
A U-2 spy plane flown by American CIA pilot Francis Gary Powers was shot down over the Soviet Union, causing the U-2 Crisis of 1960. It does not refer to the band U2 which were formed in 1976.Syngman Rhee is rescued by the CIA after being forced to resign as leader of South Korea.Payola, illegal payments for radio broadcasting of songs, are publicized by Dick Clark's testimony before Congress and Alan Freed's public disgrace.
 John F. Kennedy, a U.S. senator from Massachusetts, beats Vice President Richard Nixon in the 1960 U.S. presidential election.Chubby Checker popularizes the dance The Twist with his cover of the song of the same name.Psycho, an Alfred Hitchcock thriller, becomes a landmark in graphic violence and cinema sensationalism. The screeching violins heard at this point in the song are a trademark of the film's soundtrack.Belgians in the Congo: The Republic of the Congo (Léopoldville) was declared independent of Belgium.

 1961 
 Ernest Hemingway dies by suicide after a long battle with depression.
 Adolf Eichmann, a "most wanted" Nazi war criminal, is convicted in Israel for crimes against humanity during World War II.
 Stranger in a Strange Land, written by Robert A. Heinlein, is a breakthrough best-seller with themes of sexual freedom and liberation.
 Bob Dylan (then known as Robert Zimmerman) is signed to Columbia Records after a New York Times review by critic Robert Shelton.
 Berlins separation into West Berlin and East Berlin is cemented when the Berlin Wall is erected.
 The Bay of Pigs Invasion, an attempt by United States-trained Cuban exiles to invade Cuba and overthrow Fidel Castro, fails.

 1962 Lawrence of Arabia, Academy Award-winning film starring Peter O'Toole, premiered.
 British Beatlemania: The Beatles become the world's most famous rock band.
 Ole Miss: Southern segregationists rioted over the enrollment of Black student James Meredith at the University of Mississippi.John Glenn flew the first American-crewed orbital mission termed "Friendship 7".
 Liston beats Patterson: Sonny Liston knocks out rarely defeated Floyd Patterson in the first round of the world heavyweight boxing championship.

 1963 
Pope Paul VI becomes pope when Cardinal Giovanni Montini is elected to the title.Malcolm X incites controversy, including his statement that "the chickens have come home to roost" about John F. Kennedy's assassination.British politician sex: British Secretary of State for War John Profumo has a scandalous sexual relationship with showgirl Christine Keeler.
 JFK blown away: President John F. Kennedy is assassinated in Dallas, Texas.

 1965 Birth control: Griswold v. Connecticut challenges a Connecticut law prohibiting contraceptives.Ho Chi Minh: In opposition to North Vietnamese president Ho Chi Minh, the United States deploys troops in South Vietnam.

 1968 Richard Nixon back again: After losing to Kennedy in 1960, former Vice President Nixon is elected president in 1968.

 1969 
 Moonshot: Apollo 11 involves the first human landing on the Moon.Woodstock music festival attracts 400,000, as a touchstone of the counterculture of the 1960s.

 1970s 

 1972–1975 Watergate: The Republican burglary of the Democratic National Committee's headquarters at the Watergate office complex leads to the resignation of President Nixon.Punk rock: Raucous bands such as The Ramones and the Sex Pistols are founded.

 1976–1977 
(Note: an item from 1976 is put between items from 1977 to make the song scan better.)
Menachem Begin becomes Prime Minister of Israel and negotiates the Camp David Accords with Egypt's president.
Ronald Reagan, former governor of California, begins his US presidential campaign in 1976, and is elected in 1980.Palestine: The ongoing Israeli–Palestinian conflict escalates as Israelis establish settlements in the West Bank.Terror on the airline: Numerous aircraft hijackings take place, including an Air France flight diverted to Uganda, where the plane was stormed in Operation Entebbe.

 1979 Ayatollahs in Iran: The Iranian Revolution replaces secular Shah Mohammad Reza Pahlavi with Islamic rule by Ayatollahs led by former exile Ruhollah Khomeini.Russians in Afghanistan: The Soviet Union deploys its army into Afghanistan, beginning a decade-long war.

 1980s 

 1981–1982 Wheel of Fortune, an American television game show, debuted in 1975, hires Pat Sajak and Vanna White before becoming widely popular in syndication.

 1983 Sally Ride becomes the first American woman in space by flying aboard Challenger on the STS-7 shuttle mission.Heavy metal suicide: Heavy metal songs such as "Suicide Solution" and "Better By You, Better Than Me" are blamed by the families of fans who committed suicide.Foreign debts: Persistent trade and budget deficits lead to numerous countries defaulting on their debts.Homeless vets: Veterans of the Vietnam War, including many disabled in the service, are becoming homeless and impoverished.AIDS: The immunodeficiency disease caused by HIV emerges as a pandemic.

 1984 
Crack cocaine became a widely used form of the drug in impoverished inner cities.Bernie Goetz shoots four young black men who were trying to mug him on a New York City subway train, and is acquitted of charges.  

 1988 Hypodermics on the shore: Medical waste was found washed up on the beaches of Long Island, New Jersey, and Connecticut after being illegally dumped at sea.

 1989 
 China's under martial law: China declares martial law, resulting in the use of military forces against protesting students to end the Tiananmen protests.
 Rock-and-roller cola wars''': Soft drink giants Coke and Pepsi each run marketing campaigns using rock & roll and popular music stars.

 See also 
 "Do You Remember These", a song covering the 1950s
 "Life Is a Rock (But the Radio Rolled Me)"
 "Pencil Thin Mustache"
 "19 Somethin'", a song covering the 1970s and 80s
 Ronald Reagan in music

 References 

 Sources 

 External links 
  / BillyJoelVEVO channel
" All 59 people name-dropped in Billy Joel’s ‘We Didn’t Start the Fire’: Where are they now?" from The Los Angeles Times'', September 26, 2019
List of events mentioned in the song

1989 singles
Billy Joel songs
Songs written by Billy Joel
Billboard Hot 100 number-one singles
Cashbox number-one singles
List songs
Patter songs
Columbia Records singles
1989 songs
Songs based on actual events
Songs about nostalgia
Novelty songs
Works about the Cold War
American pop rock songs
Memes